Tim Jarvis AM (born May 1966) is a British-Australian environmental explorer, adventurer, climber, author and documentary filmmaker, with Masters qualifications in environmental science and environmental law. Due to his 2013 expedition recreating the voyage and mountain crossing of Sir Ernest Shackleton, Jarvis is considered an authority on Shackleton and the leadership style he espoused.

Tim Jarvis is well-known public speaker who presents regularly around the world. He formerly worked as a Senior Associate – Sustainability to engineering firm Arup, and has also advised the World Bank, AusAID, and the Asian Development Bank on multilateral aid projects.

His environmental work is mainly focused on climate change, sustainable aid provision in developing countries, and improving corporate environmental sustainability, as well as 'significant project' management through his project 25zero, which uses equatorial glacial melt as an indicator of global climate change, and the ForkTree Project, which aims to rewild an area of degraded farmland.

Since 2019, Jarvis has lobbied to establish an East Antarctic Marine Protected Area together with Save Our Marine Life (an alliance of leading conservation organisations) and the Pew Charitable Trust. Jarvis authored the forward to the report The East Antarctic Marine Park: Maintaining Australia's Legacy, produced in 2019.

Jarvis says he is "committed to finding pragmatic solutions to global environmental sustainability issues", and as a public speaker he talks regularly about motivation and leadership to both individuals and organisations.

Brand Associations 
In August 2016, Jarvis became Sustainability Ambassador for the Steadfast Group – Australia's largest insurance brokerage network – with climate change being identified as a major issue for the insurance sector.

In November 2016, global adventure-wear brand Kathmandu (company), announced Jarvis as their global brand ambassador. In April 2017 he was also made Global Brand Ambassador of Whyte and Mackay's Shackleton branded scotch whisky, which is a recreation of the century-old vintage discovered trapped in the ice basement of Shackleton's Hut at Cape Royds, Antarctica, by the Antarctic Heritage Trust.

Since October 2017, Tim Jarvis has been Corporate Ambassador - Sustainability for the PICA Group of Companies. PICA is the largest apartment building manager (strata corporation manager) in Australia. Jarvis is committed to "greening" the footprint of the industry.

In November 2019, Jarvis, was made AIA Insurance Vitality Ambassador, providing focus of the impact of climate change on the health sector.

In 2017, he was invited by Nissan to help promote the electric Leaf 2, filming in Bangkok for the Asian and Australian markets.

Biography and awards
Born in May 1966, Jarvis is best known for his numerous Antarctic expeditions, particularly the period recreations of historical treks by Sir Douglas Mawson and Sir Ernest Shackleton, as well as the his attempted Antarctic crossing in 1999, undertaken with fellow Australian explorer Peter Treseder. As a result of this expedition, he is the joint record holder for the fastest unsupported journey to the Geographic South Pole from the "true" edge of Antarctica (where the ice of the continent meets the sea).

He holds dual Australian/UK citizenships and spends his time primarily in Australia, with visits to the UK, the Americas, and Africa, for business and exploration-based activities and public engagements.

He is the author of The Unforgiving Minute, which recounts his expeditions to the North and South Poles as well as the crossing of several Australian deserts. He is also involved in various philanthropic ventures including as a former (until 2019) Board Member of Zoos SA (comprising Adelaide Zoo and Monarto Safari Park), fundraising work with Helping Rhinos (a UK charity aiming to save rhinoceros species from extinction) as an Ambassador of the Australian Rhino Project, and his former role as councillor of the Australian Conservation Foundation. He is also contributing author of the coursebook Frozen Planet produced by Open University, a course linked with the BBC's Frozen Planet series that aired in 2011.

Jarvis was recognised by the Australian Geographic Society, winning its "Spirit of Adventure" medal for his kayak journey across Lake Eyre, Australia's largest salt lake, in 2004.

On 20 November 2014, Jarvis was announced as WWF-Australia Global Ambassador, and was made a Governor of WWF in 2019.

Jarvis was made a fellow of the Yale World Fellows Program for 2009. The program aims to "broaden and strengthen the leadership skills of emerging leaders from across the world as they work on progressing thinking on global issues and challenges".

He was appointed a Member of the Order of Australia (AM) in 2010 for "service to conservation and the environment, particularly through advisory roles to developing countries regarding land sustainability and resource management, as an explorer, and to the community".

Jarvis was awarded Adventurer of the Year 2013 by the Australian Geographic Society and was voted Person of the Year 2014 by Classic Boat magazine for his successful re-enactment of Shackleton's 1916 Journey, the so-called 'double' comprising both sea and land legs. For his work on the 25zero project, Jarvis was awarded Conservationist of the Year in 2016 by the Australian Geographic Society.

He received the Sydney Institute of Marine Science's Emerald award (their highest) in 2013 for services to the environment. In 2014 Jarvis was a patron of NaturePlaySA (South Australia), an organisation established to increase the time children spend in unstructured play outdoors and in nature to improve their fitness, problem solving ability, emotional resilience and mental wellbeing.

In 2015, global education foundation Round Square inducted Jarvis as the first Idealist for Environmental Understanding. That same year, he was chosen as the Australian Museum's "trailblazer-in-residence" and included as one of Australia's 50 greatest explorers in the 2015 Trailblazers exhibition.

He was the joint recipient of the Jim Bettison and Helen James Award in 2016, administered by the Adelaide Film Festival, along with dancer Meryl Tankard.

In 2017, Jarvis was made a Bragg Fellow by the Royal Institution of Australia. The award recognises excellence in scientific achievement and commitment to science communication.

Expeditions

Recreation of Douglas Mawson's expedition 

In April 2007 Tim Jarvis completed an expedition in Antarctica where he attempted to recreate the pressures of the 1913 Australian Antarctic Expedition and human survival feat of Sir Douglas Mawson. Jarvis walked close to 500 km pulling a sleigh full of supplies, and living on almost the same rations as Mawson himself. Jarvis wanted to find out if the story of Mawson was physically possible. At the end of the expedition Jarvis said, "I haven't really done what Mawson did because I have doctors checking my situation, a film crew following me and a number of other safety precautions. Mawson had none of that."

The 2008 film of the expedition was released for DVD, Mawson – Life and Death in Antarctica. The summary reads, "Combining the drama of Jarvis' contemporary adventure with chilling dramatic reconstructions, expert commentary and footage from the original expedition photographed by Frank Hurley, this is an extraordinary story of human survival."  Tim is also author of a book of the same name (Melbourne University Press, 2008.

Shackleton Epic 

In February 2013 Jarvis and five others successfully recreated Sir Ernest Shackleton's 'epic' crossing of the Southern Ocean in the Alexandra Shackleton, a replica of Shackleton's lifeboat the James Caird. Using the same materials, clothing, food and a Thomas Mercer chronometer as in the original voyage, Jarvis and the team sailed their replica James Caird from Elephant Island, in the Southern Ocean, to South Georgia, just as Shackleton did in 1916. The construction of the replica James Caird was started in June 2008 and was finished in 2010, and was officially launched on 18 March 2012 in Dorset, England.

The sea voyage was followed by a trek across the mountainous interior of South Georgia to the historic whaling station of Stromness. The project, led by Jarvis, was the first (and so far only) successful recreation of the 'double' voyage using only period gear.

Members of the Shackleton's Epic crew were Nick Bubb, Barry 'Baz' Gray, Paul Larson, Seb Coulthard, and Ed Wardle. The expedition's patron was the Hon. Alexandra Shackleton, granddaughter of Sir Ernest Shackleton.

Jarvis was awarded the Royal Institute of Navigation's Certificate of Achievement, in recognition of his leadership of the Shackleton Epic Expedition Team.

A documentary of the epic crossing was made and Shackleton: Death or Glory went to air in the UK in September 2013 on Discovery UK and Australia in November 2013 on Special Broadcasting Service Australia; titled Chasing Shackleton for the USA market, it went to air in that region in January 2014 on the Public Broadcasting Service.

His book Shackleton's Epic: Recreating the World's Greatest Journey of Survival, published by Harper Collins, was released in the UK and Australia in November 2013. It was retitled Chasing Shackleton: Recreating the World's Greatest Journey of Survival for the USA market, where it went on sale in January 2014.

Projects

25zero 

Tim Jarvis founded the 25zero Project to highlight the retreat of glaciers on the world's 25 glaciated equatorial mountains. He assembled a team of mountaineers and film-makers to join him in advance of COP21 to document the impact of climate change and to communicate how each of the 25 equatorial mountains will lose its glacier 'within an average 25 years'. The first short-film was broadcast live at COP21 during a government-sponsored press conference.

At the time of the United Nations Framework Convention on Climate Change, 25 mountains had glaciers, although since that time, four have gone extinct, leaving only 21 mountains with glaciers at the equator. According to the project's website, a longer documentary series about the project is due for release in 2021.

Forktree Project 

The Forktree Project is a not-for-profit demonstration site of 133 acres (53 hectares) in South Australia's Fleurieu Peninsula for large-scale rehabilitation and 'rewilding' of agricultural land. The project aims to "show a way for private individuals to take direct action in contributing to a healthier planet by acting on climate change and improving biodiversity".

References

Australian explorers
Environmental scientists
Explorers of Antarctica
Living people
1966 births
Members of the Order of Australia